Tarkeh Veys (also known as Tark-e Veys, Tark Veys, and Tork Veys) is a village in Qaleh Shahin Rural District, in the Central District of Sarpol-e Zahab County, Kermanshah Province, Iran. At the 2006 census, its population was 378, in 94 families.

References 

Populated places in Sarpol-e Zahab County